Nesen (also Romanized as Nasan; also known as Nisind) is a village in Owzrud Rural District, Baladeh District, Nur County, Mazandaran Province, Iran. At the 2006 census, its population was 84, in 33 families.

References 

Populated places in Nur County